Marcelo Fromer (December 3, 1961 – June 13, 2001) was the guitarist of Brazilian rock band Titãs. One of the founding members and also the band's manager, he died in 2001, after being hit by a motorcycle while jogging.

Early life and youth 
Marcelo Fromer grew up in São Paulo in a house frequently visited by friends like Branco Mello, whom he met in 1974, in the Hugo Sarmento school. When he was 15 years old, he discovered The Beatles, Chico Buarque and the Tropicália, and started having guitar lessons with Luiz Tati, of the group Rumo. While studying at Equipe school, he met Tony Bellotto and formed the Trio Mamão with him and Mello. As he hated singing, he was the only one dedicated exclusively to the acoustic guitar.

Also at Equipe school, he, Mello and other classmates created the "Papagaio" magazine, featuring comics, poetry and texts about the internal decisions of the school. But he would never stop composing and playing. Soccer would also play an important role on his life. Trusty supporter of São Paulo, he managed to train for the young team of the club.

Once he finished school, he entered Linguistics at USP together with Mello, but both quit it two years later.

Works with Titãs 
In 1981, Titãs made their first performance (under the name Titãs do Iê-Iê) at the event “A Idade da Pedra Jovem”. Fromer became a little excited and decided to play the electric guitar like an acoustic one, without a pick. At the end of the night, his fingers were seriously injured and there was blood all over his white Giannini.

In 1984, with the releasing of Titãs first album, Fromer showed that he could work as a businessman, and he was chosen to be the manager the band. Another passion of Fromer, which appeared mostly during the first tours of the band, was the gastronomy. He would always choose the restaurants were the group should eat throughout the country. This passion would be the subject of the song "As Aventuras do Guitarrista Gourmet Atrás da Refeição Ideal", featured at Como Estão Vocês?.

His "business-gourmet" lives would join each other at Rock Dog (word play with Hot Dog), a snack bar specialized in hot dogs that he opened in 1989, in São Paulo, in a partnership of his brothers Thiago and Cuca, and the band members Mello and Bellotto. In 2000, he became a partner of the Campana, a Pizza shop also located in São Paulo. A year before, he released the book Você Tem Fome de Quê?, in which he listed cookery recipes from many restaurants of Brazil, along with tablatures and curiosities of Titãs main hits.

Other works 
Fromer left unfinished a biography of former football player and TV commentator Walter Casagrande, his personal friend. The project was resumed in 2008 by Gilvan Ribeiro and released in 2013.

Death 

On June 11, 2001, a day before the start of the recording of the band's 13th album,A Melhor Banda de Todos os Tempos da Última Semana, Fromer was crossing Europa Avenue in southern São Paulo when a red Honda CG125 motorcycle, driven by Erasmo Castro da Costa Jr., struck him. Erasmo called an ambulance, but fled the scene when the police arrived, as his driving license was no longer valid. Two days later, Fromer died in hospital. Presumably, his head struck Erasmo's helmet.

In July 2002, Erasmo was found by the police. He stated he did not know the man he struck was Fromer until his death. He also alleged that Fromer was to blame for the accident, as there was a crosswalk 15 meters away; Fromer decided to cross the avenue between the cars, making it impossible for Erasmo to see Fromer.

Fromer's family authorized the donation of his organs. His heart, liver, pancreas, kidneys, and his corneas were all donated.

On September 7, 2001, a skyway named after him was inaugurated over Avenida Juscelino Kubitschek, in São Paulo.

Personal life 
Fromer lived in São Paulo. By the end of the 1980s, he was in a relationship with actress Betty Gofman. His first marriage with Martha Locatelli Fromer brought along his first child, Susy. His second marriage to Ana Cristina Martinelli, also known as "Tina", resulted in the birth of children Alice and Max.

References 

Fromer’s page at Titãs official web site 
Folha’s news about Fromer’s death

External links
Titãs official website
 

1961 births
2001 deaths
Brazilian composers
Brazilian guitarists
Brazilian male guitarists
Brazilian Jews
Brazilian rock musicians
Brazilian songwriters
Pedestrian road incident deaths
Musicians from São Paulo
Road incident deaths in Brazil
Titãs members
Acoustic guitarists
University of São Paulo alumni
Rhythm guitarists
20th-century guitarists
20th-century male musicians